"I'll Never Love This Way Again" is a song written and composed by English musician Richard Kerr and American lyricist Will Jennings, and first recorded by Kerr himself for his album Welcome to the Club as "I Know I'll Never Love This Way Again", released in November 1978. A version by Cheryl Ladd was released first on her self-titled album in July 1978. The song became a hit for American singer Dionne Warwick the following year, which was produced by her labelmate Barry Manilow for Warwick's Arista Records debut, Dionne. It was also recorded by British singer Cherrill Rae Yates before Warwick recorded and released her version of the song.

The song was released as the album's lead single on July 15, 1979, by Arista. Warwick's first single on the record label after an unsuccessful tenure at Warner Bros. Records, the song brought Warwick renewed popularity when it reached number 5 on the US Billboard Hot 100 and number 6 in Canada, also peaking at number 18 on the Hot Soul Singles chart. "I'll Never Love This Way Again" was eventually certified as gold by the RIAA for sales of over one million copies and won Warwick the 1980 Grammy Award for Best Female Pop Vocal Performance.

In 1992, the song was recorded in Spanish as "Cómo te amé" by Mexican singer Yuri, from her album Obsesiones. This version peaked at number 34 on the Hot Latin Songs chart.

Charts

Weekly charts

Year-end charts

Certifications

References

External links
 

1978 songs
1979 singles
1970s ballads
Dionne Warwick songs
Cheryl Ladd songs
Songs with lyrics by Will Jennings
Songs written by Richard Kerr (songwriter)
Pop ballads
Soul ballads
Arista Records singles
Grammy Award for Best Female Pop Vocal Performance